Vladimir Frolov may refer to:

 Vladimir Frolov (footballer) (born 1982), Russian professional football player
 Vladimir Frolov (general) (died 2022), Russian major general